Moyashel and Magheradernon is a barony in the centre of County Westmeath, in the Republic of Ireland, formed by 1672. It is bordered by eight other baronies: Corkaree and Fore (to the north), Delvin and Farbill (to the east), Fartullagh and Moycashel (to the south) and Rathconrath and Moygoish (to the west).

Geography
The barony contains parts of two large lakes; Lough Ennell, shared with the barony of Fartullagh, and Lough Owel, an internationally recognised Ramsar waterfowl habitat. The River Brosna, rises in Lough Owel and is a tributary of the River Shannon. The N4, a national primary road passes through the barony to the north of Mullingar, connecting Dublin with the northwest of Ireland and the coastal town of Sligo. Railway lines carrying the national rail company Iarnród Éireann's Dublin to Longford commuter service and Dublin to Sligo intercity service stop in the barony at Mullingar railway station. The Royal Canal passes through the town of Mullingar connecting the River Liffey in Dublin to Longford town.

Civil parishes of the barony 
This table lists an historical geographical sub-division of the barony known as the civil parish (not to be confused with an Ecclesiastical parish).

Towns, villages and townlands

Ballina, a small village on the R390. Ballinea Bridge crosses over the Royal Canal. 
Mullingar is the county town of County Westmeath.

There are 100 townlands in the barony of Moyashel and Magheradernon.

Buildings of Interest
Christ The King Cathedral, Mullingar

References

External links
Map of Moyashel and Magheradernon at openstreetmap.org
Barony of Moyashel and Magheradernon, Co. Westmeath at townlands.ie

Baronies of County Westmeath